The All India Gig Workers Union (AIGWU) is a trade union federation of gig economy workers, predominantly in food delivery, in India. The federation is affiliated with the Centre of Indian Trade Unions.

History
AIGWU was founded in August 2020 during protests of Swiggy workers against a pay reduction. During these protests, AIGWU moved from organic outbursts to a strategically thinking organisation.

In December 2020, AIGWU and other Indian trade unions, including the Indian Federation of App-based Transport Workers, called on the Ministry of Labour to not exempt gig companies from contributions to state social security.

In October 2021, AIGWU reacted positively to a push by the Indian government to reclassify gig work as employment.

References

Trade unions in India
National federations of trade unions
2020 establishments in India
Trade unions established in 2020
Transport trade unions in India
Tech sector trade unions